Andreas Geritzer (born 11 December 1977, in Vienna) is an Austrian sailor in the Laser class.

At the 2000 Summer Olympics in Sydney he finished fifth, four years later at the 2004 Summer Olympics in Athens he won the Silver medal.
Geritzer resides and trains in Neusiedl am See. He has been married since 2005, and has a son.

Achievements
EC-Bronze 1998 and 2005
WC-Silver 2002
Second place at Kiel Week 2004
Silver medal at the Olympic Games 2004 in Athens

References

External links
 
 Homepage of Andreas Geritzer
 
 
 

1977 births
Living people
Austrian male sailors (sport)
Olympic sailors of Austria
Olympic silver medalists for Austria
Olympic medalists in sailing
Sailors at the 2000 Summer Olympics – Laser
Sailors at the 2004 Summer Olympics – Laser
Sailors at the 2008 Summer Olympics – Laser
Sailors at the 2012 Summer Olympics – Laser
Medalists at the 2004 Summer Olympics